Hi'ya, Chum is a 1943 American musical comedy film starring Jane Frazee and the Ritz Brothers.

Cast
 Ritz Brothers - Merry Madcaps
 Jane Frazee - Sunny Lee
 Robert Paige - Tommy Craig
 June Clyde - Madge Tracy
 Paul Hurst - Archie Billings
 Edmund MacDonald - Terry Barton
 Lou Lubin - Eddie Gibbs
 Andrew Tombes - Jerry MackIntosh
 Ray Walker - Jackson
 Richard Davies - Worker

External links
 
 

1943 films
1943 musical comedy films
American musical comedy films
American black-and-white films
Universal Pictures films
Films directed by Harold Young (director)
Films scored by Hans J. Salter
1940s English-language films
1940s American films